John William "Tree" Adams (September 22, 1921 – August 20, 1969) was an American football offensive lineman in the National Football League (NFL) for the Washington Redskins from 1945 to 1949.  He played college football at the University of Notre Dame.

Early life
Adams was born in Charleston, Arkansas as one of ten children.  He was considered normal size until he was 10, but then experienced a growth spurt during which he "shot up like a tree".  He attended Subiaco Academy in Subiaco, Arkansas, where he played high school football and basketball.

College career
Adams played college football at the University of Notre Dame from 1942-1944.  In 1943, he was the backup for Ziggy Czarobski on the 1943 championship team and then became the starting tackle in 1944.

Professional career
Adams was selected in the third round of the 1945 NFL Draft by the Washington Redskins.

References

External links
 
 

1921 births
1969 deaths
American football offensive tackles
Notre Dame Fighting Irish football players
Washington Redskins players
Players of American football from Arkansas
People from Charleston, Arkansas